Robert "Bobby" J. Greenough (born third ¼ 1939) is an English World Cup winning former professional rugby league footballer who played in the 1950s and 1960s.

Background
Bobby Greenough's birth was registered in St. Helens district, Lancashire, England, and he has retired to Eday, one of the islands of Orkney, Scotland.

Playing career

International honours
Bobby Greenough, won a cap for Great Britain while at Warrington in the 1960 Rugby League World Cup against New Zealand.

Bobby Greenough played , i.e. number 2, in the first of the three matches for Great Britain's 1960 Rugby League World Cup winning team against New Zealand, being replaced by Jim Challinor in the second game against France, and by Billy Boston in the last game against Australia.

Championship final appearances
Bobby Greenough played in Warrington's 10–25 defeat by Leeds in the Championship Final during the 1960–61 season at Odsal Stadium, Bradford on Saturday 20 May 1961.

County Cup Final appearances
Bobby Greenough played in Warrington's 5–4 victory over St. Helens in the 1959 Lancashire County Cup Final during the 1959–60 season at Central Park, Wigan on Saturday 31 October 1959.

Club career
Bobby Greenough made his début for Warrington in the 20–16 victory over Salford at Wilderspool Stadium, Warrington, he scored 30-tries in the 1960–61 season, he is only one of six players to score 30-tries in a season for Warrington, and he is eighth in the list of Warrington all-time try scorers.

Honoured at Warrington
Bobby Greenough is a Warrington Wolves Hall of Fame inductee.

Note
Bobby Greenough's surname is variously spelt correctly without an h as Greenough, and incorrectly with an h as Greenhough.

References

External links
!Great Britain Statistics at englandrl.co.uk (statistics currently missing due to not having appeared for both Great Britain, and England)
Warrington’s World Cup heroes – Bobby Greenough
Statistics at wolvesplayers.thisiswarrington.co.uk

1939 births
Living people
English rugby league players
Great Britain national rugby league team players
Lancashire rugby league team players
Rugby league five-eighths
Rugby league players from St Helens, Merseyside
Rugby league wingers
Warrington Wolves players